Hermann Clausen (July 24, 1885 – April 12, 1962) was a German politician of the Federalist Union and former SSW member of the German Bundestag.

Life 
On December 2, 1946, Clausen became a member of the second appointed state parliament in Schleswig-Holstein and, after the state elections in Schleswig-Holstein in 1947 to 1950, of the state parliament of Schleswig-Holstein. From 1949 to 1953 he was also a member of the German Bundestag. He was elected via the SSW-Landesliste Schleswig-Holstein

Literature

References

1885 births
1962 deaths
Members of the Bundestag for Schleswig-Holstein
Members of the Bundestag 1949–1953
Members of the Landtag of Schleswig-Holstein
South Schleswig Voters' Association politicians
20th-century German politicians